Salt Creek Township is one of twelve townships in Jackson County, Indiana, United States. As of the 2010 census, its population was 344 and it contained 161 housing units.

Geography
The streams of Callahan Branch, Combs Branch, Combs Creek, Fleetwood Branch, Lincoln Back Branch, Little Salt Creek, Negro Creek, Pruitt Branch and Tipton Creek run through this township.

Unincorporated towns
 Houston
 Maumee

Adjacent townships
 Washington Township, Brown County (north)
 Van Buren Township, Brown County (northeast)
 Pershing Township (east)
 Owen Township (south)
 Pleasant Run Township, Lawrence County (southwest)
 Polk Township, Monroe County (west)

Cemeteries
The township contains seven cemeteries: Callahan, Cornett, Cummings, Hanner, Lutes, Robinson and Thompson.

References
 U.S. Board on Geographic Names (GNIS)
 United States Census Bureau cartographic boundary files

External links
 Indiana Township Association
 United Township Association of Indiana

Townships in Jackson County, Indiana
Townships in Indiana